David Michael Zaslav (born January 15, 1960) is an American media executive who currently serves as the Chief Executive Officer and President of Warner Bros. Discovery. Zaslav spearheaded the transaction between AT&T and Discovery to combine with WarnerMedia and create the combined Warner Bros. Discovery in April 2022. 

Zaslav's executive compensation package includes an annual salary of $3 million with an annual $22 million bonus. In his contract extension, Zaslav also received stock options valued at $190 million, making him one of the highest-paid entertainment executives in the world. He previously served as the Chief Executive Officer and president of Discovery, Inc. beginning on November 16, 2006 and ending on April 8, 2022, when it was merged with WarnerMedia.

Early life and education
Zaslav was born to a Polish and Ukrainian Jewish family<ref>Algemeiner Journal: "Hollywood Heavyweights to Join Spielberg at Auschwitz Commemoration Ceremony in Poland" January 25, 2015 |"When I was a kid I learned in temple the mantra of ‘Never again.’ But there has been genocide since the Holocaust..."There is persecution because of religion and ethnicity. This is a moment to realize that we as a global society have to stand together."</ref> in Brooklyn, New York. At the age of 8, he moved to Rockland County where he graduated from Ramapo High School. He was captain of the varsity tennis team.

Zaslav earned a BS degree from Binghamton University.

Following this, he graduated from Boston University School of Law with a JD with honors in 1985 and started his career as an attorney with LeBoeuf, Lamb, Lieby and MacRae in New York.

 Career 

 NBCUniversal 
Zaslav joined NBC in 1989. As president of Cable and Domestic TV and New Media Distribution, he oversaw content distribution to all forms of TV, negotiated for cable and satellite carriage of NBCUniversal networks and forged media partnerships.

His responsibilities extended to Bravo, CNBC World, SCI FI, ShopNBC, Sleuth, Telemundo, Telemundo Puerto Rico, mun2, Trio, Universal HD, USA Network, NBC Weather Plus and the Olympics on cable.

Zaslav also oversaw NBCUniversal's interests in A&E, The History Channel, The Biography Channel, National Geographic International, the Sundance Channel and TiVo.

 Discovery 
Zaslav became CEO of Discovery Communications in November 16, 2006, succeeding Judith McHale. Zaslav instigated a shift in strategy by the company, aiming to see itself as a "content company" rather than a "cable company" by bolstering its main networks (such as its namesake Discovery Channel) as multi-platform brands. As CEO, Zaslav oversaw the development and launch of new networks such as Planet Green (later rebranded as Destination America), The Hub, Oprah Winfrey Network (OWN), Velocity, and Investigation Discovery, as well as the company's 2018 acquisition of Scripps Networks Interactive, expansion of its digital education operations, and current emphasis on streaming services.

Under his leadership, Discovery began trading as a public company in 2008, became a Fortune 500 company in 2014 and acquired Scripps Networks Interactive in 2018.

 Warner Bros. Discovery 
In May 2021, it was announced that Zaslav would serve as CEO of a proposed merger of Discovery with a spin-out of AT&T's WarnerMedia. Zaslav's executive compensation package includes an annual salary of $3 million with an annual $22 million bonus. In his contract extension, Zaslav also received stock options valued at $190 million.

Since August 2022, Zaslav received heavy criticism for his decision to heavily shrink down the content library on the streaming service HBO Max, to be used as tax write-offs. The total accounted loss was nearly $25 billion off the company's market cap. Some of those projects were "practically finished" or in the late stages of post-production, including Batgirl and Scoob! Holiday Haunt. Zaslav also received backlash for the removal of many of Warner Bros' animated programs from streaming platforms and pulling some of the service's content in general, including Final Space (which was written off for taxes), Infinity Train, Summer Camp Island, Close Enough,  The Not-Too-Late Show with Elmo and several hundred episodes of Sesame Street, among others, a decision Infinity Train'' creator Owen Dennis remarked rendered many of the programs effectively as "lost media".

Boards and other activities 
Zaslav serves on the boards of Sirius XM, The Cable Center, Center for Communication, Grupo Televisa, Partnership for New York City, Syracuse University and USC Shoah Foundation. He also is a member of the Board of Trustees for the Paley Center for Media and the Mt. Sinai Medical Center. He is chair of the Auschwitz: The Past Is Present Committee which promotes awareness of the Holocaust. In 2012, he received the Steven J. Ross Humanitarian Award from the UJA-Federation of New York which honors people of vision, energy and sustained achievement in the entertainment, media and communications industries.

In 2014, Zaslav was awarded the Fred Dressler Leadership Award by Syracuse University's S. I. Newhouse School of Public Communications.

David Zaslav was awarded the Susan Newhouse & SI Newhouse Award of Hope for his support of the Association for Frontotemporal Degeneration (AFTD) in September 2016.

In 2017, Zaslav was inducted into the Cable Hall of Fame.

In 2022, he was named one of Time's 100 Most Influential People.

Personal life
Zaslav lives in New York City with his wife Pam and the couple has three children. His daughter Ali Zaslav is a congressional producer with CNN.

References 

1960 births
20th-century American Jews
21st-century American Jews
American chief executives in the media industry
American people of Polish-Jewish descent
American people of Ukrainian-Jewish descent
American television executives
Binghamton University alumni
Boston University School of Law alumni
Businesspeople from Brooklyn
Living people
NBCUniversal people
Warner Bros. Discovery people